Macelignan (Anwulignan) is a lignan. It can be found in Myristica fragrans, the nutmeg.

Medical research
One study has shown that macelignan may exert antimicrobial and anticariogenic activity against Streptococcus mutans, but this is not a currently used treatment.

Macelignan may also act as an antidiabetic molecule via PPAR signaling and upregulate adipocyte gene expression

Macelignan may contain antioxidant and anti-inflammatory properties and is marketed in breast enhancement creams for its anti-aging properties.

References

Lignans
Methoxy compounds